In algebraic geometry, given a projective algebraic hypersurface  described by the homogeneous equation

 

and a point

 

its polar hypersurface  is the hypersurface

 

References

Projective geometry